Nanima is a locality in the Yass Valley Council area, New South Wales, Australia. It lies on both sides of the Murrumbateman Road between Murrumbateman and Gundaroo, about 37 km north of Canberra.

Nanima is also a civil parish of Murray County. It is located northwest of the current locality of Nanima in the Murrumbateman area, although there is also a Murrumbateman parish that lies further north.

References

Yass Valley Council
Localities in New South Wales
Southern Tablelands